The Hundru Falls is a waterfall located in Ranchi district in the Indian state of Jharkhand. It is the 34th highest waterfall in India. It is one of the most famous tourist places in the region.

Geography

Location
Hundru Falls is located at 

Note: The map alongside presents some of the notable locations in the district. All places marked in the map are linked in the larger full screen map.

The falls

On the course of the Subarnarekha River, where it falls from a height of  creating one of the highest water falls in the state. The spectacular scene of water fallit height has been described as a sight to behold. The different formations of rock due to the erosion by the constantly falling of water have added to the beauty of the place.

The Hundru Falls at one of the edges of the Ranchi plateau is one of the several scarp falls in the region. During rainy season it takes a formidable form but in the dry season it turns into an exciting picnic spot. At the base of the Hundru Falls, there is a pool, which serves as a bathing place.

The Hundru Falls is an example of a Knick point caused by rejuvenation. Knickpoint, also called a nick point or simply nick, represents breaks in slopes in the longitudinal profile of a river caused by rejuvenation. The break in channel gradient allows water to fall vertically giving rise to a waterfall.

Transport
 
There is also a shortcut and simple four-lane road from Ranchi via Ormanjhi via Sikidiri to Hundru.

There is also a Suvarna Rekha Hydral Project located down the falls which is also a good place for Tourists.

See also
List of waterfalls in India
List of waterfalls in India by height

References
 

Waterfalls of Jharkhand
Waterfalls of India